Maithan Alloys Limited is a publicly listed company at NSE which manufactures, sells manganese and ferro-alloys within India and internationally, is traded as MAITHANALL. It has registered office in Kolkata, India. It's led by Subhas Agarwalla as chairman and managing director, Subodh Agarwalla as chief operating officer. It's part of Maithan's group which is currently valued at Rs. 16,000 crores (2.5 Billion U.S. dollars) and has a market capitalization of Rs. 3,842 crores (650 million U.S. dollars) in 2019. On 20 March 2017, it was criticized by Meghalaya's chief minister Mukul Sangma as being one of the major polluters of the state. It has plants in multiple states: Jharkhand, Meghalaya, Andhra Pradesh.

References

Companies listed on the National Stock Exchange of India
Manufacturing companies based in Kolkata
Metal companies of India
Companies with year of establishment missing